Australian National Fabrication Facility (ANFF) has its headquarters at the Melbourne Centre for Nanofabrication in Clayton, Victoria. It is an organization that links eight corresponding university-based nodes to offer researchers with access to up to date fabrication facilities.

Each of the eight nodes provide capability in a specific range of areas to meet researchers’ different fabrication needs. The nodes consists of different partners as listed below.

Victorian Node (Melbourne Centre for Nanofabrication):
 Monash University
 CSIRO
 Deakin University
 La Trobe University
 University of Melbourne
 Swinburne University of Technology
 RMIT University
 Victoria University

ACT Node:
 Australian National University
Queensland Node:
 University of Queensland
 Griffith University

NSW Node:
 University of New South Wales
South Australia Node:
 University of South Australia
 Flinders University

OptoFab Node:
 Macquarie University
 University of Adelaide
 University of Sydney
Western Australian Node:
 University of Western Australia
Materials Node:
 University of Wollongong
 University of Newcastle

References

External links 
 Australian National Fabrication Facility Ltd
 Melbourne Centre for Nanofabrication
 NSW Node
 ACT Node
 Materials Node
 OptoFab Node
 South Australia Node

Companies based in Melbourne